Donald Griffin (1915–2003) was an American professor of zoology.

Donald Griffin may also refer to:

Don Griffin (born 1964), American football player
Don Griffin (halfback) (born 1922), American football player